Wilhelm Cutti (* 9. May 1900 in Wien, Austria-Hungary; † 2. Februar 1962 in Oberneukirchen, Austria) was an Austrian international footballer.

References

1900 births
1962 deaths
Association football forwards
Austrian footballers
Austria international footballers
FK Austria Wien players